The Pilot II was a buoy tender operated by Canada's Ministry of Transport on Great Slave Lake and the rest of the Mackenzie River system in the Northwest Territories.

The Pilot II draft was only 42 inches, and her twin propellers were enclosed in tunnels.
She was built in the Russel Brothers shipyard in Owen Sound, Ontario, then disassembled so she could be shipped by rail to Waterways, Alberta, a riverport on the Clearwater River. Her parts were shipped by barge to Fort Smith, Northwest Territories, where they were portaged around the extensive rapids there, so she could be reassembled and launched on the lower Slave River.

She was rebuilt in 1970, when her length was extended by 14 feet.
By 1971 the vessel's ownership had been transferred to Arctic Offshore, but continued to be chartered to perform her usual duties.

Her crew of four live aboard during the short northern shipping season, where their accommodation includes a "full galley", and a "jacketed heater" for domestic hot water.

References

Water transport in the Northwest Territories